Aziza Rebah (born 4 July 1986) is a Moroccan footballer who plays as a defender for ASFAR and the Morocco women's national team.

Club career
Rebah has played for ASFAR in Morocco.

International career
Rebah has capped for Morocco at senior level.

See also
List of Morocco women's international footballers

References

External links

Living people
Moroccan women's footballers
Women's association football defenders
Morocco women's international footballers
1986 births